Reihan Morshed Salam (born 29 December 1979) is a conservative American political commentator, columnist and author who since 2019 has been president of the Manhattan Institute. He was previously executive editor of National Review, a columnist for Slate, a contributing editor at National Affairs, a contributing editor at The Atlantic, an interviewer for VICE and a fellow at the University of Chicago Institute of Politics.

Early life and education
Salam was born in Brooklyn, New York. His parents are Bangladeshi-born Muslim immigrants who arrived in New York in 1976. Salam attended Stuyvesant High School and Cornell University before transferring to Harvard University, where he was a member of the Signet Society and lived in Pforzheimer House. He graduated from Harvard in 2001 with an A.B. degree in Social Studies.

Career
After graduating from Harvard, Salam worked as a reporter-researcher at The New Republic and as a research associate at the Council on Foreign Relations before becoming an editorial researcher for David Brooks at The New York Times. Salam also worked as a producer for NBCUniversal's The Chris Matthews Show, and as an associate editor at The Atlantic, thereafter accepting a fellowship at the think tank, New America.

National Review
In 2014, Salam was named executive editor of National Review. While on staff, National Review gained a reputation for publishing clashing opinions on a wide range of policy issues.

Grand New Party: How Republicans Can Win the Working Class and Save the American Dream
In 2008, Salam co-authored Grand New Party: How Republicans Can Win the Working Class and Save the American Dream with Ross Douthat. The book grew from a cover story for The Weekly Standard, which called for a reinvention of Republican domestic policy. Salam and Douthat argued that the Republican Party had lost touch with its own base and that its Bush-era, big-government policies were "an evolutionary dead end." They instead advocated "tak[ing] the 'big-government conservatism' vision" of Bush and giving it "coherence and sustainability" by vigorously serving the interests of the less affluent voters, who had become the party's base. The platform would include "an economic policy that places the two-parent family—the institution best capable of providing cultural stability and economic security—at the heart of the GOP agenda."

Melting Pot or Civil War?: A Son of Immigrants Makes the Case Against Open Borders
Salam's second book Melting Pot or Civil War?: A Son of Immigrants Makes the Case Against Open Borders, was released in 2018. It "contends that while the United States should welcome more high-skilled immigrants, mass low-skilled immigration is swelling the number of poor people in a country that is struggling--with modest success at best--to fulfill the aspirations of the less privileged citizens already living here". The New York Times Ross Douthat (co-author of Salam's previous book) described it as "a rigorous, policy-driven argument for more-humane-than-Trump immigration restriction". Megan McArdle commended it for its "admirable and all-too-rare willingness to lay out the problem in clear terms", and Noah Smith, writing in Foreign Affairs, called it, "a thoughtful well-informed, mostly economic argument for limiting low-skilled immigration". Cato Institute immigration expert Alex Nowrasteh argues that Salam makes numerous factual and logical errors in arguing for reducing immigration.

Manhattan Institute presidency
In February 2019, it was announced that Salam had been selected to become the new president of the Manhattan Institute for Policy Research. He succeeded Larry Mone, who retired after leading the Institute for 24 years. In May 2019, he officially took the helm. "I know not only that ideas matter, in other words, but also that the Institute's ideas can change lives for the better", he said at the Institute's 2019 Hamilton Award Dinner", continuing:

A self-described "coalition builder", Salam was profiled in the  Wall Street Journal shortly after taking on the presidency and  described his interest in examining topics like urban "political monocultures", and "punitive multiculturalism", while still maintaining the Institute's focus on issues such as school choice, pension reform, limited government, and lower taxes.

In 2022, Salam defended Manhattan Institute fellow Christopher Rufo amid his campaigns to ban LGBTQ instruction at schools.

Political views and style
Salam has been described as "Literary Brooklyn's Favorite Conservative." He has written that he intends to "pump ideas into the bloodstream of American conservatism."

Salam has taken a strong interest in congestion pricing and the encouragement of denser living arrangements, the promotion of natural gas and nuclear power, reform of the US tax code, and the fostering of a more competitive and diverse marketplace of educational providers. In the wake of the shooting death of Michael Brown in Ferguson, Missouri, Salam argued that white flight and unsustainable urban sprawl had contributed to high poverty levels. Drawing on the San Francisco Bay Area as an example, he has identified restrictive zoning policies as an important barrier to upward mobility in the US. He has defended work requirements for welfare recipients in New York City and elsewhere.

He initially supported the Iraq War but has since called it a disaster of "world-historical proportions." He claims to advocate policies that strengthen traditional family structure and has opposed  gay marriage. He has described as "brilliant" figures like Canadian Marxist philosopher Gerald Cohen and Reagan adviser and neoclassical economist Martin Feldstein.

He has called for reducing immigration levels to encourage assimilation and integration, advocating the end of automatic birthright citizenship.

Bibliography

Books
 With Ross Douthat, Grand New Party. New York: Doubleday, 2008.
 Melting Pot or Civil War? New York: Sentinel, 2018.

Recent articles
 The Atlantic, "New York's Socialist Revolution Isn't What It Seems", July 8, 2019
 The Atlantic, "The New GOP Coalition Is Emerging", November 14, 2018
 National Review, "Melting Pot or Civil War?", October 15, 2018
 The Wall Street Journal, "A Way Out of the Immigration Crisis", September 21, 2018
 The Atlantic, "A Better Way to Absorb Refugees", September 6, 2018
 The Atlantic, "The GOP's Path to Economic Populism", April 27, 2018
 The Atlantic, "A Single Solution for New York's Two Biggest Problems, April 11, 2018

References

External links

 
 Profile of Salam at TheAmericanScene.com
 Profile of Salam at The New America Foundation site
 Slate articles by Salam
 Video debates featuring Reihan Salam on Bloggingheads.tv
 
 "They're Young, They're Bright, They Tilt to the Right" A conversation with Ross Douthat and Reihan Salam from n+1
 Review Essay by Salam in March/April Foreign Affairs The Missing Middle in American Politics; How Moderate Republicans Became Extinct
 

1979 births
Living people
 American Muslims
American people of Bangladeshi descent
American bloggers
American male journalists
Journalists from New York City
Stuyvesant High School alumni
Cornell University alumni
Harvard University alumni
National Review people
New York (state) Republicans
21st-century American non-fiction writers
American male bloggers